A Basque pelota ball is a ball designed for the sport of Basque pelota, variations of the kind and size of balls are given by the peculiar category.

Hand Pelota
Hand-pelota ball is traditionally made of a Buxus core, covered by several layers of Latex with a final layer of leather.

Paleta Categories
A highly elastic rubber made ball is employed for speed games. The ball reaches a speed of 120 km/h in a typical service.

Balls
Basque pelota